Piazza Bra, often shortened to Bra, is the largest piazza in Verona, Italy, with some claims that it is the largest in the country.  The piazza is lined with numerous cafés and restaurants, along with several notable buildings.  The Verona Arena, an amphitheatre built nearly 2000 years ago, is now a world-famous music venue with regular operatic and contemporary music performances.  Verona's town hall, the Palazzo Barbieri, also looks out across the piazza.

Architecture
A garden within Bra is shaded by cedar and pine trees.  It surrounds the fountain of the Alps and a bronze statue of Victor Emmanuel II.   This monument to the first king of Italy, in which he is sat atop a horse, was inaugurated on 9 January 1883, five years to the day after his death.

There are many significant buildings within and around Bra, with construction taking place over many centuries.

Verona Arena

The building itself was built in the first century AD on a site then beyond the city walls. The ludi (shows and games) staged there were so famous that spectators came from many other places, often far away, to witness them.  While it can now host crowds of up to 22,000, the original amphitheatre could seat 30,000 spectators.  The arena has been used by many contemporary performers including Pink Floyd, Rod Stewart, Elton John, and Muse.  It has also hosted numerous operas, including in 1946 Ponchielli's La Gioconda which saw the debut of Maria Callas.

Gran Guardia

Palazzo della , was the first building erected on the southern edge of Bra.  It was originally designed by Domenico Curtoni as a roof built from the existing wall out to several pillars.  Leonardo Donato, 90th Doge of Venice, had requested an area for troops to shelter in poor weather.  Work commenced in 1610 but stopped when there was a shortfall in available funds.  Nearly 200 years later, in 1808, architect Giuseppe Barbieri was commissioned to design and complete the project but it was a further 45 years before it was finished.

The building is now used as a venue for conferences, meetings, and exhibitions.

Palazzo Barbieri

Palazzo Barbieri is Verona's town hall.  Originally named Palazzo della Gran Guardia Nuova, it was designed by Giuseppe Barbieri and was later named in his honour.  Construction began in 1836 and was completed by 1848.

References

Piazzas in Verona